Hesham Ismail (born June 11, 1969) is a former American football offensive lineman who played one season with the Tampa Bay Storm of the Arena Football League (AFL). He was drafted by the Pittsburgh Steelers in the eighth round of the 1992 NFL Draft. He played college football at the University of Florida and attended Auburndale High School in Auburndale, Florida. He has also been a member of the Scottish Claymores of the World League of American Football (WLAF).

References

External links
Just Sports Stats
Fanbase profile
totalfootballstats.com profile

Living people
1969 births
Players of American football from Florida
American football offensive linemen
Florida Gators football players
Pittsburgh Steelers players
Tampa Bay Storm players
Scottish Claymores players
Sportspeople from Polk County, Florida